The Town That Drowned is a coming of age novel by Riel Nason and was first published in Canada in 2011 by Goose Lane Editions. It has won many awards including ‘Winner 2012 Commonwealth Book Prize’, was a finalist in the 2012 'CLA Young Adult Book Award’ and was a Top 5 contender for 'CANADA READS’. Due to its success, the novel was published in Australia and New Zealand by Allen & Unwin in 2013.The novel is told by a 14-year-old girl named Ruby Carson and is based on true events set in the 1960s. Nason combined key elements of other CanLit novels to create The Town That Drowned. The novel gives an insight of human nature and includes the awkwardness of childhood, thrill of first love and emphasises on how important it is to have a place to call home.

Characters

Ruby Carson 
Ruby is the main character of this novel and the story is told entirely from her point of view. She is a 14‑year-old girl. Near the beginning of the book she has a vision of some of the townspeople swimming around her and one person happens to be someone she had never seen before. Ruby gets bullied at school (mainly by June Crouse) as a result of this incident. To make things worse, she has a unique brother who is seen as a freak by others. She receives suspicion after the townspeople learn that her house would be saved from being flooded (Later on, it is revealed that Ruby had to move anyway since the water went further than expected). Her best friend and cousin is Sarah Carson who was always there for Ruby. However, in that year, Sarah moved to another town and leaving Ruby to face her troubles on her own. Later on in the story Ruby falls in love with Troy Rutherford, who happens to be her first lover.

Percy Carson 
Percy Carson is a 9-year-old boy at the start of the story and is the younger brother and only sibling of Ruby, the protagonist. He is one of the people greeted by Ruby in her prophecy. It is heavily implied that he has autism because his reactions do not lie in the normal realm of response for the events that provoke this. For example, he had a fit of crying after the ends of one of his shoelaces broke, rendering them uneven but had little to no reaction to the death of the Carson family cat, Quilty. Percy's implied autism has caused him to have an obsession over consistency and a great dislike of change. When it is revealed that their Carson home is going to be moved due to the flooding of the valley, he has another of his fits. He possesses great intellectual ability, as seen in his recollection of facts and ease with his classwork but cannot think past what has been taught to him, Percy was unable to deal with a misprint in his maths textbook. His manner of speaking is unlike what other children of his age use, but is a formal style akin to what would be seen business letters. All these peculiarities result in his bullying by Ronnie Crouse. However, Percy does not seem to be distracted by this.

Percy maintains a constant physical appearance with his white tee shirt and blue jeans. He disregards the weather and these items of clothing are worn no matter what the temperature is. It is revealed Percy has blond hair when Ruby retells the story of the nativity scene that Lily painted for the church. He also wears glasses.

His involvement with the plot begins at the start of The Town That Drowned. His bottle launch project and subsequent connection to the site of the launches, the Hawkshaw Bridge, is the reason why Ruby first sees the surveyor. This project is also what brought Miss Stairs and Mr Howard to know each other. ′Hello Percy.′ is the final name said by Ruby in her vision and although lacking any obvious significance in the plot, on the final page of chapter 14 and because Ruby connects the deaths of Mrs Abernathy, Mr Cole and Mr Crouse to her prophecy, his death is foreshadowed. At his final bottle launch, Percy impulsively jumps off the bridge and into the water below at the sight of soldiers jogging towards him. He is successfully revived by the army personnel and upon regaining consciousness, he says ″Hello Ruby,″ to which Ruby replies ″Hello Percy″, fulfilling the prophecy.

Mr Ellis Cole 
Mr Cole is a 79-year-old man who is very kind and quite friendly and owns a farm which he inherited from his family which generations and generations of his family had owned. Ruby's mother was quite close with Mr Cole ever since she was young as she would usually sit on the farm gate to draw. Ruby's summer job is to help Mr Cole around the house while his housekeeper takes a vacation. Halfway through the story, after they find out that the town was going to be flooded, Mr Cole goes missing. After a while, Ruby finds Mr Cole's clothes by the river and it was then revealed on that Mr Cole had actually drowned. Though it is never stated by Mr Cole why he would drown himself, Ruby thinks that the reasons why were that the valley that he lived in (and the valley that generations of Mr Cole's family had lived in) was going to be flooded and that his farm was going to be used as an area for new residents. She thought he could not bear having to see all this change to his beloved home area.

Sarah Carson 
Sarah Carson is Ruby's best friend and cousin. Her family moved in the beginning of the story and as she usually was the person who helped Ruby in dealing with the bullying which was caused from the skating incident, Ruby felt like she was all alone. Sarah in the beginning had a crush on Collin Moore. After she had moved and visits Ruby, she changed a lot. She had her hair cut up to her shoulders, she made three new girlfriends and she spotted the boy that she might want to marry. Sarah starts to brag about all the wonderful new things at her new place which results in Ruby feeling quite depressed and left out.

Troy Rutherford 
Troy is a very charming boy, so much so that Ruby is mesmerised when she bumps into him at the moving of the Fosters’ house. Around Ruby's age, he is tall, very tanned, has light brown hair and has the bluest eyes Ruby had ever seen. He has come down to the town with his father, an antiques salesman. Upon meeting each other at the Foster's Store a few times, he soon develops feelings for Ruby, becoming her boyfriend not long after. He is quite the smooth talker, trying his best to impress Ruby. Having the chance to only come to the town every couple of months, he resorts writing letters to Ruby. As the story progresses, Troy gets to spend a bit of time with Ruby and they make the most of it, watching the town as it is taken down for the future dam to be built.

Miss Vergie Stairs 
Miss Stairs is a formerly single 33‑year-old woman, one of Lily Carson (Ruby's mother)'s best friends. Miss Stairs often brings sweets when she visits Lily and she is portrayed in the story as quite a person who talks a lot and knows all sorts of different information as she works in Foster's store which is where she hears all her information. Miss Stairs also fantasizes a lot about things such as her wedding. She talks a lot about her fantasy with Lily and they keep editing it and perfecting and they have gotten every detail down. They talked about it so much that Ruby eventually thought it was going to actually happen. In the story it is revealed that Miss Stairs is somewhat of a hoarder, a person who keeps all her things and never throws anything out. Later on in the story she starts dating Mr. Hazen Howard and soon, they get married.

Plot summary 
The Town that Drowned is a book that takes place in a small town called Haventon in the late 1960s. The book begins with Ruby Carson (the main character and also the narrator), watching her autistic brother Percy on the old Hawkshaw Bridge. Her brother had been releasing empty Nesbitt's Orange bottles with seven pebbles closed with wax, a rolled up rag and a piece of cork. He consistently wears the same white T-shirt and blue jeans and he walks the same 273 short measured paces to the exact middle of the bridge. Each bottle also contains an envelope with a 5-cent stamp and a note with their address asking for the receiver's geographical location with specific details.
Ruby foresees the town submerged during an ice skating town event, after falling through the frozen river. “I could see into the river, and under the water was all of Haventon. There was our house at the edge, then the houses of our neighbours. I saw the high school and the churches. I saw the apple orchard and the garage and the Legion.”
Surprisingly, Ruby's vision actually occurs.
One night, Miss Stairs comes to the Carson's house and fills them in on the Haventon news. She explains that she found a survey marker along the shore. At first they think that it's for the new bridge, but they find out from a phone call to Ruby's father that there isn't going to be a new bridge. Instead, a dam was going to be put across the river and will be a hydroelectric plant constructed to produce energy for the province. The water on Ruby's side of the dam will be backed up, causing permanent flooding. People will be forced to sell their homes, barns and farmland. Houses will be moved or destroyed, dismantled or burned.
Throughout the novel, Ruby and her family experience many hardships. Along with Percy's strange nature, and Ruby being an outcast, their family struggles with the town ‘drowning’ and the dam being built. This event leads to many disruptions within the town causing casualties.
A map is introduced throughout the town showing the areas that would be affected by the flood. Everything that would be underwater is coloured blue. Anything that would be safe from the flood but would be too close to the shoreline is coloured green. What's left is yellow. Only the Carson's house was depicted as yellow. This results in the town turning against Ruby's family under the impression that they knew the plan all along because of Mr Carson's position in the government.

Structure 
The Town that Drowned is a work of fiction. It is written in the first person and is narrated by its main character, Ruby Carson, who recounts the story of her journey in past tense from the summer of 1965. Although the story is told by a 16‑year-old girl, the language used is semi-formal in the sense that not much colloquial language is used. However, she still speaks her own thoughts and also sometimes aloud in ways that shows that she is still a child.
The story is split into three sections, the sections are presented in chronological order; Summer 1965, Spring 1966 and Spring 1967. The novel depicts the psychological and moral growth of Ruby and her brother Percy.
The book begins with Ruby Carson describing Percy as he performs his regular bottle launch into the river and she explains the setting. The first section of the book mainly explains and sets the story in the town and the reputations that Ruby and her family have within their community. The second section of the book (Spring 1966) is where the complication of the story begins and develops. The final section of the story is labelled Spring 1967 and is where all the problems that Ruby and her family have are solved (the resolution) and where all her life goes back to normal except even better than before.

The structure also has a metaphorical meaning behind it. The fact that the first part is Summer 1965, is used to convey a joyous tone and provide readers' with an opportunity to understand how happy it is. This is because summer in literature is known to represent relaxation and happiness. This is especially true for all the characters' except Ruby. For instance, Mr Cole celebrating his birthday and Lily painting everything in happy colours. Sara who also finds a future husband, moves etc. also experiences this. To Ruby, summer conveys a heat/cool atmosphere. For Ruby she feels the heat of summer and has a negative impact of her where she is viewed as an outcast. Being referred to "Mother Nature daughter's" along with her best fried Sara portrays this to an amazing extent. When Ruby goes through many problems such as being lonely, she is the heat side of summer and Sara going through happy moments - therefore being the cold part of these sisters.

Genre 
The Town That Drowned is a 21st-century coming of age story set between the years of 1965 and 1967 in New Brunswick, Canada. Although it is an adult novel, it also conveys the crossover success it has had as a young adult book. The author, Riel Nason utilises a calm and gentle way of telling the story as she navigates through the literary metaphor and biblical significance with ease.

Themes 
The Town that Drowned explores many themes centred on the characters of the book such as:

Sense of home/sense of family 
“Where your treasure lives your heart will live also.”
Throughout the novel, characters, especially Ruby Carson learns to embrace the fact that no matter where you are, your family is your home. As it is not where your house is, your belongings or the amount of money you have that make your house your home. It is the people around you that makes home inviting.

Identity 
Identity in this novel mainly focuses on the protagonist Ruby as  she encounters a series of change and acceptance during such a radical economical alteration in her town during the 1960s.

"Weird is a disease, once you have it, you have it..There's no special prescription". Ruby Carson's much known remark about herself in the beginning of the novel portrays how she associates her perceived weirdness as an illness in the beginning and how she believe she will have it forever. This shows us that her identity in the beginning of the novel is distorted and she has a lowered self-esteem. This identity is further illuminated when Ruby makes remarks on her hobby - woodcarving. Although, woodcarving wasn't popular at her time, Ruby still pursued this pastime. However, she does feel very pressured as a result from it and fears her secret will soon be found out by everyone. She states "I don't go around incriminating sawdust on my dress". This tells us that she is afraid of showing such a hobby in public. However, we do know that it is part of her identity when she remarks that woodcarving reminds her of happy times and keeps her jovial during the most melancholic of times. Despite all this reduced self belief, Ruby's identity, obviously as the book is a coming-of-age novel, changes and she becomes more confident, aware and knowledgeable as she grows and matures. She is able to accept who she is for the first time and be herself, despite the number of changes occurring around her. This much obvious confidence is depicted through the departure of her best friend - Sarah (who was her buffer) and she became more confident and speaking up for herself as a result. However, the major thing that lead to her identity to change in a positive path was Troy Rutherford or her first love. The relationship between the two allowed Ruby to finally accept compliments, see that she was loved and understand her value without underestimating it. The kindness and compassion that  Troy showed and the interest he showed in Ruby's woodcarving saw her open up about this pastime to even her school bullies - people who she never even dared to talk to early on in the novel". As a result of this relationship, we know that Ruby's identity changed significantly where she calmly recounts, recalling Troy's words in first person narration "It's just the people in this place that distort me, like a reflection in the river...Sometimes different is a good thing". This quote is notably important to help us understand Ruby's identity growth in the novel. She finally accepts that being different isn't necessarily a bad thing and knows that it was just her town's perception all along. Her identity further grows in the novel, through her character development where she develops more mother like characteristics of care and worry, allowing us to deduce that her confidence has given her that high maturity and identity growth.

Life is unpredictable/The unexpected course of life 
In order to fit in, you need to embrace it.
This theme is more focused on Percy than any other character in the book. Percy is afraid of change and by the end of the book; he learns to accept the manoeuvering of his house, with certain conditions. Another example of this theme is shown when Ruby gave Percy a new chess set that she carved herself, and he chose to accept to change and move on from his old chess set to the new.

Change 
Changes in life make you embrace life even if you don't want to,
as shown above, Percy did not want to embrace change but because life is changing so rapidly he realises that it is not fear of change, but fear of being left behind.

Rural values vs urban convenience
People who reside in metropolitan areas (especially the government) are more than willing to replace rural values for urban convenience, as they replaced farmland with a town, making the area more populated which benefits the government economically.

Local populations and untrusted government 
The relationship between local population and untrusted government
The government does not know the local population, local population knows the government. Therefore, the government cannot attend to the local population's needs or is unaware of it. As shown in the book, the government decided to replace the rural area with a town without the locals consent. Thus, the locals were unprepared and were forced instead of voluntarily move out. As shown, this relationship is one of mistrust and unjustness. At the very least the government should have offered relocation, free housing and support (financial and emotional).

Motifs and symbols 
The Town that Drowned portrays many different motifs and symbols. The author, Riel Nason, shows these throughout the story through the characters and significant events that occur. These are very relatable to modern everyday life, as they portray things like the hardship of life as a teenager and also provide premonitions to events later in the book.

The dam 
The dam itself that was being built represents the people's sacrifice for the sake of urban convenience. The townspeople never get a real say in the progress of the plans and instead simply told to leave. The townspeople only had the choices of either leaving and burning their homes or moving them to a different location. The dam would swallow nearly the entire town in which so many people had lived their whole lives for generations. The government was taking all their history away and forcing the people to let go and move on, thus sacrificing rural values for urban convenience.

Troy and Mr Rutherford 
The arrival of Troy and his father was sort of like a preview to the immense change that was to befall the town. With such a small community, strangers were uncommon and the arrival of the pair was a strange one. Mr Rutherford's occupation was also like a premonition to  future events. As a man who bought and sold antique items which the people called 'old junk', his presence was foreshadowing the fact that the people were going to have to let go of their past to make way for change and development.

Percy 
Percy is Ruby's younger brother. He is a nine-year-old boy implied to have Asperger syndrome (a high-functioning form of autism). This causes him to have nervous breakdowns and cry at the smallest of things. The existence of Percy represents how hard it is for a family with a child with a mental instability to live. Percy is an outcast of the town due to his disability. This also portrays what it is like to be a small child who has always been alone and an outcast his community.

The one-hundred year old tree 
It represents the connection between the old and new town: ‘It seems hard to believe, but even I think it’s likely true. I’m standing in front of a hundred-year-old tree that has grown new roots and a house that already seems well rested from its journey.’ This quote also shows how everyone has finally accepted they fate and is ‘well-rested’ from their journey of being forced to move out of a town that they have lived in all their lives. The relocating of the tree depicts how the hundred-year-old tree is important to the community and also shows attachment of place of how the community will always attempt to find a way to relive and reminisce the old town and a dedication to remember Mr Cole. git!

Publication 
The Town that Drowned won the 2012 Commonwealth Book Prize for Canada and Europe, the 2012 Margaret and John Savage First Book Award and the 2013 Frye Academy Award. It was a finalist for the 2012 Canadian Library Association Young Adult Book Award, the 2013 OLA Red Maple Award and was longlisted for the 2013 International Dublin Literary Award.

Canadian young adult novels
2011 Canadian novels
Novels set in the 1960s
Goose Lane Editions books